Codru Reserve (plural: Codrii) is a scientific reserve in Străşeni District, Moldova. It was founded in 1971 and covers an area of 5,177 hectares.

See also
Codrii

External links
 Codru
 

Protected areas established in 1971
Scientific reserves in Moldova
Strășeni District